The Military ranks of Togo are the military insignia used by the Togolese Armed Forces. Being a former colony of France, Togo shares a rank structure similar to that of France.

Commissioned officer ranks
The rank insignia of commissioned officers.

Other ranks
The rank insignia of non-commissioned officers and enlisted personnel.

References

External links
 

Togo
Military of Togo